This is a list of the first qualified female pharmacists to practice in each country, where that is known.

Please note: the list should foremost contain the first female pharmacist with a formal qualification from each country. Historically, it was normal for widows of apothecaries and pharmacist to inherit their late husband's profession without being formally qualified. These cases – and other of note – can be noted in the margin, but should not be listed first.

Africa 

 Namibia: There might be more female graduates, as the names listed were the only women named in the cited article.
Nigeria: Green is considered to have been the first female pharmacist in West Africa. Ekanem Bassey Ikpeme was considered the first native female pharmacist in Nigeria.
Tunisia: Dorra Bouzid is considered the first female pharmacist in Tunisia after independence. She started her practice sometime during the 1960s.

Americas 

 Canada: Preevoot was considered the first Canadian woman to pass the pharmacy exam by law.
Chile: Glafira Vargas was the first female to graduate with a pharmacy degree in 1887, though Hinojosa appears to be the first female to work as a pharmacist upon graduation.
Curaçao: van heb Elizabeths-Gasthu was said to have been the first woman to have passed the exam for an assistant pharmacist in the colony.
 Guatemala: Altuve is considered the first Central American woman to have obtained a university degree.
 United States: Elizabeth Gooking Greenleaf was the first not formally qualified pharmacist to practice in 1727. Hayhust was the first woman to receive a pharmacy degree in the United States in 1883. Ella P. Stewart was one of the first African-American female pharmacists in the United States."Ella Stewart." Contemporary Black Biography. Vol. 39. Detroit: Gale, 2003. Accessed via Biography in Context database, 2016-07-02. Available online via Encyclopedia.com.

Asia 

 Indonesia: Jacobs is considered the first female pharmacist in the Netherlands and Indonesia (then Dutch East Indies).

Europe 

 Belgium: Certain sources cite Louise Popelin (sister of Belgium's first female lawyer Marie Popelin) or Ida Huys as Belgium's first female pharmacist. They both completed their exams in 1887.
Czech Republic and Slovakia: Other sources cited Elza Fantová as the first Bohemia woman to earn a pharmaceutical degree in 1908. Krontilová-Librova started her pharmacy practice in 1904 and became the first female pharmacy student at the University of Prague in 1907 (graduating in 1909).
Finland: The first female pharmacist to qualify without dispensation in Finland was Helene Aejneleus in 1911. Brunberg was the first women to be qualified by dispensation.
 Germany: Anne of Denmark, Electress of Saxony was a non-professional female pharmacist in Germany. Helena Magenbuch and Maria Andreae were professional pharmacists in the 16th-century.
 Ireland: Wilson was the first female pharmacist to qualify in the south of Ireland.
 Italy: Elisa Gagnatelli and Edvige Moroni were the first women to pass the pharmacy exam in 1897.
Netherlands: In the Netherlands and the Dutch East Indies, Charlotte Jacobs became the first female pharmacist with a degree in 1879.
Norway: Christine Dahl passed her assistant pharmacy exam in 1889, but Eide was considered the first female pharmacist.
Poland: Although Lesniewska was considered the first female pharmacist, Filipina and Konstancja Studzinska (sisters) were the first women to pass the pharmacy examination in 1824.
 Russia: Olga Evgenevna Gabrilovich was the first female pharmacist to earn a degree in 1906.
 Sweden: Leth was the first female pharmacist to have fulfilled a formal qualification. Maria Dauerer was the first female pharmacist to have obtained a license. The first woman to have obtained a degree in pharmacology was Agnes Arvidsson (1903).
 Ukraine: Makarova, a Kiev University (Ukraine) graduate, was the first woman to pass the examination for the title of pharmaceutical assistant.

Oceania

See also 
List of first female physicians by country
List of first women dentists by country
Women in medicine
Women in pharmacy

References 

Pharmacists
Pharmacists, Nationality
Pharmacists, Nationality